Katarina Kruhonja (born 1949) is a peace activist from Osijek, eastern Croatia. She is a director of the Centre for Peace, Non-violence and Human Rights, an NGO based in Osijek, set up with the support of Adam Curle. In 1998, she was joint recipient of the Right Livelihood Award along with Vesna Terselic of the Anti-War Campaign of Croatia.

References

External links
Recipient page on Right Livelihood Award website
Centre for Peace, Non-violence and Human Rights, Osijek

Croatian activists
1949 births
Living people